Breezy Path is a short and steep one-way road in the Mid-Levels, Hong Kong Island. It begins at the intersection point between Lyttleton Road and Park Road and ends at an intersection at Bonham Road.

Traffic can only travel downwards from Park Road to Bonham Road. There are no shops along the road; there are only residential buildings (Ying Piu Mansion) and the Hong Kong Institute of Technology. It provides a faster way to go from Lyttleton Road to Bonham Road and Caine Road, and some minibus routes use it as a shortcut, e.g. the number 56 route, which goes from Robinson Road to North Point.

The Hong Kong Institute of Technology building on Breezy Path is being demolished to make way for Ying Wa Girls' School's expansion.

References

Mid-Levels
Roads on Hong Kong Island